Ectoedemia albifasciella is a moth of the family Nepticulidae. It is found in all of Europe except the Mediterranean Islands. In the east it ranges to the Volga and Ural regions of Russia.

The wingspan is 5–6 mm. The head is orange and the forewings are dark brownish with a broken creamy fascia. Adults are on wing in June.

The larvae feed on Quercus petraea, Quercus pubescens, Quercus pyrenaica, Quercus robur, Quercus rubra and occasionally also on Castanea sativa. They mine the leaves of their host plant. The mine consists of a narrow corridor, with a broad frass line, running along a vein. The corridor runs away from the midrib most of the time, but might run along the midrib. The corridor widens abruptly into a blotch filled with frass. There are several mines in a single leaf most of the time. Pupation takes place outside of the mine.

External links
UKmoths
Ectoedemia albifasciella images at  Consortium for the Barcode of Life
bladmineerders.nl
Ectoedemia albifasciella at Naturhistoriska riksmuseet
Nepticulidae from the Volga and Ural region

Nepticulidae
Moths of Europe
Moths described in 1871